Olivier Broche (born 18 December 1963) is a French actor and producer. He is best known for playing in the cult TV series Les Deschiens (1993–2002), in which he play alongside Yolande Moreau.

Filmography

On Stage

References

External links 

French male film actors
Living people
20th-century French male actors
21st-century French male actors
French male stage actors
French male television actors
Male actors from Paris
1963 births